Attacus caesar is a moth in the family Saturniidae. It is found in the southern Philippines.

References

Saturniidae
Moths described in 1873
Moths of Asia